The Butt Bridge is a road bridge in Dublin, Ireland which spans the River Liffey and joins Georges Quay to Beresford Place and the north quays at Liberty Hall.

The original bridge on this site was a structural steel swing bridge, designed by Bindon Blood Stoney, opened in 1879 and named after Isaac Butt (who died that year), leader of the Home Rule movement.

The swing section, made of wrought iron and weighing 200 tons, ran on a series of cast-spoke wheels and was powered by a steam engine, which was housed on a timber pier on the downstream side of the bridge. The swing action allowed boats to pass and berth in the river as far upstream as Carlisle Bridge (now O'Connell Bridge).

In 1932, the swing bridge was replaced with a three span fixed structure of reinforced concrete, but retained its original English name. The Irish name of the bridge however, Droichead na Comhdhála or "Congress Bridge", derives from the Eucharistic Congress of 1932 which was held in Dublin that year.

The central span of the current bridge is formed by two cantilevered sections, with the two approach spans acting as counterweights. This model represented the first use in reinforced concrete of a cantilevered and counterweight construction in either Britain or Ireland.

References

Bridges in Dublin (city)
Bridges completed in 1932